The Roman Catholic Diocese of Viedma (Dioecesis Viedmensis) is encompassed in the Ecclesiastical Province of Bahía Blanca.  the Bishop was Monsignor Esteban María Laxague, Salesian of Don Bosco appointed by Pope John Paul II on October 31, 2002.
The Diocese was erected on April 20, 1934. It is suffragant to the Metropolitan Archdiocese of Bahía Blanca. His predecessor was HVRE Marcelo Angiolo Melani, Bishop from June 28, 1995 until 2002, when Laxague took over.
Located in the Rio Negro Province, Argentina, the diocese has its see in the City of Viedma, by the shores of Río Negro River and close to the coast of the Atlantic Ocean.

Bishops

Ordinaries
Nicolás Esandi, S.D.B. † (13 September 1934 – 29 August 1948) Died
José Borgatti, S.D.B. † (28 August 1953 – 26 October 1973) Died
Miguel Esteban Hesayne † (5 April 1975 – 28 June 1995) Resigned
Marcelo Angiolo Melani, S.D.B. (28 June 1995 – 9 January 2002) Appointed, Bishop of Neuquén
Esteban María Laxague, S.D.B. (31 October 2002 – Present)

Coadjutor bishop
Marcelo Angiolo Melani, S.D.B. (1993-1995)

Auxiliary bishops
Miguel Angel Alemán Eslava, S.D.B. (1968-1975), appointed Bishop of Río Gallegos
Carmelo Juan Giaquinta (1980-1986), appointed Bishop of Posadas

See also
 Roman Catholicism in Argentina

References

External links
 Diocese of Viedma 

Roman Catholic dioceses in Argentina
Roman Catholic Ecclesiastical Province of Bahía Blanca
Christian organizations established in 1934
Roman Catholic dioceses and prelatures established in the 20th century
1934 establishments in Argentina